Wayne Allen Trimble (born December 10, 1944) is a former American football defensive back who played one season with the San Francisco 49ers of the National Football League (NFL). He was drafted by the 49ers in the fourth round of the 1967 NFL Draft. He played college football at the University of Alabama and attended Cullman High School in Cullman, Alabama.

References

External links
Just Sports Stats
College stats
Wayne Trimble trading card
Wayne Trimble Crimson Replay

Living people
1944 births
Players of American football from Alabama
American football defensive backs
American football quarterbacks
Alabama Crimson Tide football players
San Francisco 49ers players
People from Cullman, Alabama